Ankam is a Malayalam word meaning combat or battle. It may refer either to a duel or a larger scale war. In medieval Kerala, ankam served as a way to settle disputes between districts and nobles. The duellists, called Chekavar or Ankachekavar, were trained in the kalari to fight as militiamen in service of a lord. When a dispute arose between two local rulers, each side would engage warriors to fight for them in organised single combat at a fixed place and time. Each local ruler was represented by one Ankachekavar. The ankam were usually fought to the death, and the ruler represented by the surviving Ankachekavar was considered the winner.

References

Dueling
Trials by combat